P.A.O.K. Women's Volleyball Club or PAOK Women's Volley, is a Greek volleyball club based in Thessaloniki and part of the major multi-sport club PAOK. The department was founded in 1985 and refounded in 2010.

History
PAOK women's volleyball club was only active for 13 years, from 1985 until 1998. In 2003 it merged with Filathlitikos and ceased to exist.

It was founded again in 2010 and is currently and after reaching A2 it fell again in the 3rd level for 2012–13, B Ethiki.
In 2017 the team promoted into A2 Ethniki Women's Volleyball. In 2019 the club won the Pre League Championship, and promoted to the A1 Ethniki. In 2021 the club won the Greek Cup.

Honours

Domestic competitions
  Greek Cup
Winners (1):  2020–21

Recent Seasons

Notes

Current squad

Greek Cup Finals

European record

See also
 PAOK Men's Volleyball Club

References

External links
  

Volleyball in Greece
Thessaloniki